Joseph Grogan is the former director of the United States Domestic Policy Council and assistant to President Donald Trump. Appointed by Acting Chief of Staff Mick Mulvaney, Grogan converted the traditionally small office into an influential policy council.

Grogan worked from 2017 to January 2019 as a health care official in the Office of Management and Budget. He was appointed a member of the White House Coronavirus Task Force in January 2020.

On April 29, 2020, Grogan announced he would resign on May 24. He subsequently joined the board of directors of Verde Technologies.

References 

1972 births
Living people
Trump administration personnel
United States Office of Management and Budget officials
University at Albany, SUNY alumni
William & Mary Law School alumni